Piletosoma guianalis is a moth in the family Crambidae. It was described by Schaus in 1924. It is found in Guyana.

References

Moths described in 1924
Pyraustinae